Saint-Michel is a station on Line 4 of the Paris Métro in the 5th arrondissement. Located in the Quartier Latin, it offers a connection to the St-Michel - Notre-Dame RER station on RER lines B and C.

The station was opened on 9 January 1910 as part of the connecting section of the line under the Seine between Châtelet and Raspail. It is named after the Boulevard Saint-Michel.

Architecture

Like nearby Cité, Saint-Michel features a pioneering construction technique, made necessary by the proximity of the Seine. The station comprises three steel caissons – one for the train hall and two for access at each end – which were assembled at the surface and then lowered into place.

The platforms are 118 metres long, more than the standard length on the network. This allows it to potentially handle eight-car trains, however, due to the other stations having an average of 100-meter platforms (excluding Cité, which has 110-meter platforms), and the Line's ongoing process for automatic operations, the trains in the Line 4 will be limited to six-car trains.

Nearby attractions 
 Île de la Cité
 Île Saint-Louis
 Notre Dame Cathedral

Station layout

Gallery

See also
 St-Michel – Notre-Dame (Paris RER)

References

 Roland, Gérard (2003). Stations de metro: D'Abbesses à Wagram. Éditions Bonneton.  .

External links 
 

Paris Métro stations in the 5th arrondissement of Paris
Railway stations in France opened in 1910